Greg Kennedy may refer to:

 Greg Kennedy (footballer) (born 1949), Australian rules footballer
 Greg Kennedy (hurler) (born 1976), Irish hurler
 Greg Kennedy (historian), Canadian military historian and author